The 2019 Conference USA baseball tournament was held from May 22 through 26 at MGM Park in Biloxi, Mississippi.  The annual tournament determined the conference champion of the Division I Conference USA for college baseball.  The tournament champion, Southern Miss, received the league's automatic bid to the 2019 NCAA Division I baseball tournament.

The tournament was established in 1996, Conference USA's first season of play. Rice has won the most championships, with seven.  Defending champion Southern Miss has four titles, and UAB and FIU each have one.  No other current members have won the event, with the Conference seeing major changes in membership in recent years.

Seeding and format
The top eight finishers from the regular season were seeded one through eight.  The tournament used a double elimination format.

Bracket and results

Conference championship

References

Tournament
Conference USA Baseball Tournament
Conference USA baseball tournament
Conference USA baseball tournament
College sports tournaments in Mississippi
Baseball competitions in Mississippi
Sports in Biloxi, Mississippi